Atlantis is a 1973 concept album by Dutch rock and pop band Earth and Fire. The first half of the album (Side 1 of the original vinyl pressing) comprises a suite based on the story of the greedy and corrupt island of Atlantis, which is ultimately destroyed by the four elements: earthquakes represent Earth, volcanoes represent Fire, volcanic gases represent Air and finally the island is inundated by Water.

Track listing
Side One
"Atlantis" – (Chris Koerts, Gerard Koerts, Hans Ziech) – 16:22
 "Prelude"
 "Prologue (Don't Know)"
 "Rise and Fall (Under a Cloudy Sky)"
 "Theme of Atlantis"
 "The Threat (Suddenly)"
 "Destructions (Rumbling from Inside the Earth)"
 "Epilogue (Don't Know)"

Side Two
"Maybe Tomorrow, Maybe Tonight" – (G. Koerts, Ziech, C. Koerts) – 3:12
"Interlude" – (G. Koerts, C. Koerts) – 1:57
"Fanfare" – (Ton van der Kleji, Ziech, G. Koerts, C. Koerts) – 6:03
"Theme from Atlantis" – (C. Koerts, G. Koerts) – 1:50
"Love Please Close the Door" – (G. Koerts, Ziech, C. Koerts) – 4:11

Personnel
 Jerney Kaagman – lead vocals
 Chris Koerts – electric and acoustic guitars, backing vocals
 Gerard Koerts – organ, backing vocals, Mellotron, piano, synthesizer, flute, virginal
 Hans Ziech – bass
 Ton van der Kleij – drums, percussion

1973 albums